Perekeshkul (also, Perekeşkül,  Pirəkəşkül, Perekeshkul’, Perekischkjul, Perekishkyul’, and Pirekeshkyul’) is a village in the Absheron Rayon of Azerbaijan. The village forms part of the municipality of Pirəkəşkül-Qobustan.

Perekeshkul is the site of a new missile base, opened on June 11, 2018, by President Ilham Aliyev. The base houses Polonez-M and LORA missile systems.

References 

Populated places in Absheron District